The 2010 IMSA Cooper Tires Atlantic Championship season was due to be the 37th Atlantic Championship season, and the second one under the sanctioning of the International Motor Sports Association. However, on March 3, 2010 — just over two weeks prior to the scheduled opening round — series personnel announced that the 2010 season had been placed on hold.

Race schedule
A twelve-race calendar was announced on November 13, 2009. Five races were due to support the American Le Mans Series, with two more supporting the Rolex Sports Car Series. The remaining five races were due to be feature or co-feature events, including both double-header weekends.

Drivers and teams
Swan Racing, Jensen MotorSport, Condor Motorsports, Paladin Motorsports, US RaceTronics, Comprent Motorsport, Polestar Racing Group and Team Tonis had announced plans to contest the championship. The only driver announced prior to the 2010 season hiatus was Zach Veach, who was due to become the series' youngest ever driver.

References

External links
 The official website of the Atlantic Championship

Atlantic Championship
Atlantic Championship seasons
Atlantic Championship season